Steve Stuart Wayne Liburd (born 26 February 1985 in Basseterre, St Kitts) is a West Indian cricketer who played in the 2004 U-19 Cricket World Cup in Bangladesh. He plays first-class and List A cricket for the Leeward Islands. 

Steve starred in the Stanford 20/20 as captain of St Kitts Tournament held in the Caribbean. In 2007 he was professional at Royton CC in the Central Lancashire League.

References

1985 births
Living people
People from Basseterre
Kittitian cricketers
Leeward Islands cricketers
Saint Kitts representative cricketers
Rest of Leeward Islands cricketers
West Indian cricketers of the 21st century